FaceApp is a photo and video editing application for iOS and Android developed by FaceApp Technology Limited, a company based in Cyprus. The app generates highly realistic transformations of human faces in photographs by using neural networks based on artificial intelligence. The app can transform a face to make it smile, look younger, look older, or change gender.

Features
FaceApp was launched on iOS in January 2017 and on Android in February 2017. There are multiple options to manipulate the photo uploaded such as editor options of adding an impression, make-up, smiles, hair colors, hairstyles, glasses, age or beards. Filters, lens blur and backgrounds along with overlays, tattoos, and vignettes are also a part of the app. The gender change transformations of FaceApp have attracted particular interest from the LGBT and transgender communities, due to their ability to realistically simulate the appearance of a person as the opposite gender.

Criticism 
In 2019, FaceApp attracted criticism in both the press and on social media over the privacy of user data. Among the concerns raised were allegations that FaceApp stored users' photos on their servers, and that their terms of use allowed them to use users' likenesses and photos for commercial purposes. In response to questions, the company's founder, Yaroslav Goncharov, stated that user data and uploaded images were not being transferred to Russia but instead processed on servers running in the Google Cloud Platform and Amazon Web Services. According to Goncharov, user photos were only stored on servers to save bandwidth when applying multiple filters, and were deleted shortly after being uploaded. US senator Chuck Schumer expressed "serious concerns regarding both the protection of the data that is being aggregated as well as whether users are aware of who may have access to it" and called for an FBI investigation into the app. The specific section of the apps terms of service that drew concern were as follows:

A "hot" transformation was available in the app in 2017 supposedly making its users appear more physically attractive, but this was accused of racism for lightening the skin color of black people and making them look more European. The feature was briefly renamed "spark" before being removed. Founder and chief executive Yaroslav Goncharov apologised, describing the situation as "an unfortunate side-effect of the underlying neural network caused by the training set bias, not intended behaviour" and announcing that a "complete fix" was being worked on. In August that year, FaceApp once again faced criticism when it featured "ethnicity filters" depicting "White", "Black", "Asian", and "Indian". The filters were immediately removed from the app.

See also

Face of the Future
Deepfake

References

External links
 Official website

Android (operating system) software
Computer-related introductions in 2017
IOS software
Photo software
Proprietary cross-platform software
Social media
Deep learning software applications
Deepfakes